Creatures of Leisure is the fourth studio album released by Australian band, Mental As Anything. It was released in March 1983 and peaked at #8 on the Australian Album charts.

Reception
AllMusic called it The Mentals' "best album to date" saying "it is a must have for pure pop fans, new wave fans, rock & roll fans, and Aussie rock fans" and noted similarities with Rockpile and Squeeze".

Rip It Up said "Album number four and the cracks are beginning to show, just a little. Not that this is a bad record. It's just that it gets the slightest bit dull and workmanlike. I'm afraid the title of the first track sums it up: 'Spirit Got Lost'.

Track listing

Australian edition

International Edition 

The version of Creatures of Leisure released in North America dropped the tracks "Space to Let" and "Country in the Concrete", and added "Working for the Man" and "Seems Alright to Me".  Additionally, "Nothing's Going Right Today" appeared in remixed form.

"Business & Pleasure", which was a completely unlisted track on the Australian release, was listed on the sleeve and on the label of the international edition, although it was not listed on the lyric sheet.

Personnel

Musicians
 Martin Plaza — lead vocals, guitar    
 Greedy Smith — lead vocals, keyboards, harmonica
 Reg Mombassa — guitar, vocals  
 Peter O'Doherty — bass, guitar, vocals
 Wayne de Lisle – drums

Recording details 
 Bruce Brown — Producer, Engineer 
 Russell Dunlop — Producer, Engineer 
 David Hemming — Assistant Producer, Assistant Engineer
 Frank DeLuna — Mastering

Additional credits on international edition 
 Mark Moffatt — Producer (tracks: 7 & 9)
 Ricky Fataar — Producer (tracks: 7 & 9)
 Tim Kramer — Engineer (tracks: 7 & 9)
 Joe Raine — Remix (track 6)

Art work 
 Martin Plaza — Artwork 
 Syd Shelton — Cover Design, Photography
 Reg Mombassa — Drawings 
 Ken Smith — Finished Art
 Jon Watkins — Finished Art
 Melanie Nissen — Finished Art

Charts

Release history

References 

1983 albums
Mental As Anything albums
Regular Records albums
Festival Records albums
A&M Records albums
CBS Records albums